The 2022 Ligier European Series is the third season of the Ligier European Series. The six-event season began at Circuit Paul Ricard on 15 April, and will finish at Algarve International Circuit on 15 October.

Calendar

Entries

Teams and drivers

Results
Bold indicates overall winner.

Championships

JS P4 Drivers

JS2 R Drivers

JS P4 Teams

JS2 R Teams

Notes

References

External links 
 

Ligier European Series
Ligier European Series
Ligier European Series